Thomas William Wukovits (February 4, 1916 – November 12, 1991) was an American professional basketball player. He played in the National Basketball League for several teams in the 1930s and 1940s, including the Akron Firestone Non-Skids, Toledo Jim White Chevrolets, and Cleveland Allmen Transfers. In 109 career games he averaged 6.3 points per game. Wukovits won an NBL championship in 1939–40 with Akron.

References

1916 births
1991 deaths
Akron Firestone Non-Skids players
American men's basketball players
Basketball players from South Bend, Indiana
Cleveland Allmen Transfers players
Guards (basketball)
Indianapolis Kautskys players
Notre Dame Fighting Irish baseball players
Notre Dame Fighting Irish men's basketball players
Toledo Jim White Chevrolets players